Chunuk Bair is a 1992 New Zealand film based on the play Once on Chunuk Bair (1982) by Maurice Shadbolt.

Set in 1915, the film tells of the Wellington Regiment, part of the New Zealand Expeditionary Force present at Gallipoli during World War I. On 8 August 1915, the Regiment took and held Chunuk Bair, one of the Turkish hills.

Chunuk Bair was produced by Daybreak Pictures in association with Avalon and the National Film Unit.  It was released to roughly coincide with Anzac Day, the national day of Remembrance in New Zealand and Australia.

The central characters are Frank South (Robert Powell) and Colonel William Connolly (Kevin Wilson) who have differing opinions about the battle.

Cast
Robert Powell as Sgt Maj Frank Smith
Kevin J. Wilson as Connolly
John Leigh as Porky
Murray Keane as Smiler
Danny Mulheron as Bassett
Richard Hanna as Lt Harkness
Lewis Rowe as Johnston
Norman Forsey as Hamilton
Darryl Beattie as Scruffy
John Wraight as Mac
Peter Kaa as Otaki George
Stephen Ure as Holy

Crew
Producer: Grant Bradley
Exec Producers: Grant Bradley, David Arnell
Director: Dale G Bradley
Writer: Grant Hinden-Miller, adapted from the play by Maurice Shadbolt
Cinematographer: Waka Attewell

References

External links
 
 
 NZ on Screen page

1992 films
1990s New Zealand films
1992 drama films
1990s English-language films
New Zealand drama films
World War I films set in the Middle East
Films set in 1915
Films about the Gallipoli campaign